PF-05105679 is a drug which acts as a potent and selective blocker of the TRPM8 ion channel, which is the main receptor responsible for the sensation of cold. It was developed as a potential analgesic, and blocks the sensation of cold in both animals and human trials. It also lowers core body temperature in small mammals, but does not produce this effect in humans in the normal dosage range.

See also
 AMG-333
 RQ-00203078

References 

Quinolines
Tertiary amines
Benzoic acids
Fluoroarenes
Amides